Brain freeze is an alternative name for a cold-stimulus headache.

Brain freeze may also refer to:

 Brainfreeze (album), 1999 live mix album by DJ Shadow and Cut Chemist
 Brain Freeze (film), a 2021 zombie film directed by Julien Knafo
 Brain Freeze, 2007 book in the Otto Undercover miniseries
 Brain Freeze, parody song in The Simpsons episode "That '90s Show"
 "Brain Freeze", episode from the 17th season of Arthur
 "Brain Freeze", series finale of the show Fanboy & Chum Chum
 "Brain Freeze", trademark used on the 7-eleven slurpee

See also
 Brain Freezer, character on the American-Canadian cartoon show Johnny Test